Seija Saara Maria Simola (25 September 1944 Helsinki – 21 August 2017 Vantaa), married Franzén, was a Finnish singer. She began her career musical in the mid-1960s in the band Eero Seija & Kristian Trio, and her debut solo album was released in 1970: Seija Simola 1. The 1970s would be her most successful decade.

In 1978, she represented  Finnish Broadcasting Company (Yle) at the Eurovision Song Contest 1978. There she performed the entry  Anna rakkaudelle tilaisuus (Give love a chance), on 22 April 1978. The song finished in the 18th position with a total of two points. Despite this poor result, Simola continued a long and successful career in her native Finland.

Discography 
 Trio (1970)
 Seija Simola 1 (1970)
 Aranjuez mon amour – näkemiin (1970)
 Rakkaustarina (1971)
 Seija (1973)
 Tunteen sain (1976)
 Seijan kauneimmat laulut (1977)
 Katseen kosketus (1979)
 Tunteet (1984)
 Ota kii – pidä mua (1985)
 Seija (1986)
 20 suosikkia – Sulle silmäni annan (1995)
 Parhaat – Seija Simola (1995)
 20 suosikkia – Rakkauden katse (2002)
 Sydämesi ääni (2005)

References

External links 
 Lyrics of the entry  Anna rakkaudelle tilaisuus 

1944 births
2017 deaths
Eurovision Song Contest entrants of 1978
Eurovision Song Contest entrants for Finland
20th-century Finnish women singers
Musicians from Helsinki